Just watch me is a phrase made famous by Canadian Prime Minister Pierre Trudeau.

Just Watch Me may also refer to:

 Just Watch Me: Trudeau and the '70s Generation, a 1999 Canadian documentary film by Catherine Annau
 Just Watch Me: The Life of Pierre Elliott Trudeau Vol. 2: 1968-2000, a 2009 book by John English
 Just Watch Me: Remembering Pierre Trudeau, a 1984 book by Larry Zolf
 Just Watch Me..., a 2002 romance novel by Julie Elizabeth Leto
 Just Watch Me, an unreleased album by Jordan McCoy, or the title song
 "Just Watch Me", a song by G. Hannelius
 "Just Watch Me", a song by Kate Voegele from her 2014 Wild Card EP

See also
"You Just Watch Me", a song by Tanya Tucker
Watch Me (disambiguation)